Gojak is a surname. It may refer to:

 Amer Gojak (born 1997), Bosnian association footballer
 Bojan Gojak (born 1979), Serbian association footballer
  (born 1983), Croatian actress 
 Linda Gojak, American mathematics educator
 Mira Gojak (1963), Australian artist

See also: Gojak Hydroelectric Power Plant